Sivniguda is a town in Bastar district, Chhattisgarh, India.

Location
Sivniguda is 40 km from Jagdalpur. Chitrakot waterfalls is towards south west of Sivniguda. Nearest airport is Raipur Airport and railway station is at Jagdalpur.

National Highway 43 passes through Sivniguda.

See also
 Chitrakot

References

External links
 About Sivniguda

Cities and towns in Bastar district